The Garden State Athletic Conference (GSAC) is a junior college conference in the National Junior College Athletic Association (NJCAA) for many technical and community colleges in New Jersey. And it is one conference in the Region 19 of the NJCAA. Conference championships are held in most sports and individuals can be named to All-Conference and All-Academic teams.

Members
Atlantic Cape Community College
Bergen Community College
Brookdale Community College
Camden County College
County College of Morris
Essex County College
Mercer County Community College
Middlesex County College
Ocean County College
Passaic County Community College
Raritan Valley Community College
RCSJ–Cumberland
RCSJ–Gloucester
Salem Community College
Sussex County Community College
Union County College

Former Members
Delaware Technical & CC/Stanton-Wilmington
Delaware Technical & CC-Terry
Delaware Technical & Community College
Rowan College at Burlington County
Thaddeus Stevens College of Technology (Penn.)

See also
National Junior College Athletic Association (NJCAA)
Pennsylvania Collegiate Athletic Association

External links
GSAC members
NJCAA Region 19 website
NJCAA Website

 
College sports in New Jersey